The Good Humor Man may refer to:

a salesman of Good Humor ice cream bars
The Good Humor Man (1950 film), a crime comedy starring Jack Carson
The Good Humor Man (2005 film), a romantic drama featuring Nathan Stevens and Cameron Richardson
"The Good Humor Man He Sees Everything Like This", a song from the Love album Forever Changes

See also
 Good humor (disambiguation)